David Hulme may refer to:

David Hulme (rugby league) (born 1964), rugby league footballer of the 1980s and 1990s
David Russell Hulme (born 1951), Welsh conductor
David Hulme (academic) (born 1952), development studies professor
David Hulme (evangelist), host of the TV series The World Tomorrow

See also
David Hume (disambiguation)
Hulme (disambiguation)